The basketball competition at the 1991 European Youth Olympic Days was held from 18 to 20 July. The events took place in Brussels, Belgium. Boys  born 1976 or 1977 or later participated in the event. No girls event was held.

Medal summary

Men

References

Basketball at the European Youth Summer Olympic Festival
Basketball
1991–92 in European basketball
International youth basketball competitions hosted by Belgium